A Little Chaos is a 2014 British period drama film directed by Alan Rickman. The story was conceived by Alison Deegan who co-wrote the screenplay along with Rickman and Jeremy Brock. The film stars Kate Winslet, Matthias Schoenaerts, Alan Rickman, Stanley Tucci, Helen McCrory, Steven Waddington, Jennifer Ehle, and Rupert Penry-Jones. The film was financed by Lionsgate UK and produced by BBC Films. It was the second film directed by Rickman, after his 1997 directorial debut The Winter Guest, as well as the last before his death in 2016. It was the second collaboration of Rickman and Winslet after their 1995 film Sense and Sensibility. Production took place in London in mid-2013. The film had its world premiere at the 2014 Toronto International Film Festival as the closing night film on 13 September 2014.

Plot

King Louis XIV of France assigns the design and construction of the Gardens of Versailles to head landscape architect André Le Nôtre. Already overwhelmed, managing several projects, Le Nôtre interviews several other garden designers, including Sabine de Barra. 

When Sabine arrives on the palace grounds, she moves a potted plant prior to her interview, so Le Nôtre asks her if she gives deference to order in design. Sabine affirms her respect for landscape "order", but when pressed suggests that she would rather create something uniquely French than follow classical and renaissance styles. Clearly offended, Le Nôtre reminds her that everything he has built and designed follows "order". She apologises, sincerely admiring him and his work. Mid-sentence, Le Nôtre interrupts and shows her the door; she leaves disheartened.

 André mulls over the candidates, under pressure to please the King. His assistant judiciously re-presents Madame de Barra's designs to him, prompting André to reconsider them. 

André surprises Sabine at her home, and after admiring her seemingly untamed but magical garden, gives her the outdoor bosquet ballroom project at Versailles, combining fountains and landscaping. His original plans require a costly fresh water supply, but Sabine suggests continuously recycling water through the fountains using a reservoir. As work begins on her design, the original workmen initially make little progress, however Sabine is offered another crew and construction begins.

A striking commoner, artlessly beautiful and fearlessly honest, Sabine attracts attention at court. She is befriended by the King's brother Duc Philippe d'Orléans and his wife Elizabeth Charlotte, Princess Palatine. 

Sabine and André start a quiet, loving friendship, mutually attracted but not acting on their feelings. André quietly endures his wife Françoise's infidelities, who insists the key to his success is her court influence. When she senses his interest in Sabine and warns him against an affair, he quotes her about their right to seek comfort elsewhere, becoming determined to pursue a relationship with Sabine.

Queen Maria Theresa dies suddenly. Stunned at the loss of his wife, the King takes refuge among his prized pear trees. Sabine finds him there, initially mistaking him for the gardener. The King enjoys her warmth and forthrightness, and once she recognises him, they continue their conversation as equals. He invites her to travel with him to the Palace of Fontainebleau.

At the Versailles garden site, Françoise finds Sabine, and insists André's interest in her won't last. Later on Françoise's lover (at her request) opens the reservoir's sluice gates during a powerful storm, flooding the worksite and destroying much of the earthworks. Sabine nearly drowns trying to close it, but André rescues her. The next morning, she works vigorously to mend the damage. That same day, the King visits the worksite, assessing the project skeptically but allows it to proceed. Afterwards, André finds Françoise's glove there. Realising she is behind the sabotage, he confronts her with the glove and ends their relationship.

Sabine is introduced around court by the Duc de Lauzun and the King's mistress, the Marquise de Montespan. Once they discover that she is widowed and also lost her 6-year-old daughter, they share their own losses and welcome her, as the King forbids such topics before him. 

The Marquise formally presents Sabine to the King when he arrives, and she offers him a four-seasons rose — the same found in the garden where they had met. Conversing about roses' nature and life cycle, beauty, hardships, and death is Sabine's veiled defense of Madame de Montespan, who has begun to lose the King's favour. He is again moved by her observations.

André waits for Sabine outside her room that night, and they finally make love. In the morning, André finds himself alone in bed. Sabine is upstairs, traumatised by a regular haunting flashback of the day her daughter and husband died: prior to taking their daughter with him on a day trip, he revealed to Sabine that he had a mistress. Sabine saw the carriage had a faulty wheel, learned from the footman that they were actually going to his mistress's, not on a business trip. Racing after them, when she tried to stop the carriage, it veered off track, toppling down a steep hill and killing both father and daughter. 

André finds Sabine mid-flashback, and convinces her to stop blaming herself for their deaths, calming her down. She asks him what will happen with his wife and he says their marriage is over, then asks about them and she says that they will shape one another.

At the garden project's inauguration, the King and his court arrive and dance to the music of a hidden orchestra, as the fountains send water coursing down the tiers around the ballroom floor. After Sabine dances with the King, she and André join hands, kiss, and leave to walk into the forest together.

Cast

 Kate Winslet as Sabine de Barra
 Matthias Schoenaerts as André Le Nôtre
 Alan Rickman as King Louis XIV
 Stanley Tucci as Philippe, Duc d'Orléans
 Helen McCrory as Madame Le Nôtre 
 Steven Waddington as Thierry Duras
 Jennifer Ehle as Madame de Montespan
 Rupert Penry-Jones as Antoine Lauzun
 Paula Paul as Princess Palatine
 Danny Webb as Claude Moulin
 Phyllida Law as Suzanne

Production
The story was conceived by Allison Deegan, who co-wrote the screenplay along with Rickman and Jeremy Brock. The film was financed by Lionsgate UK and produced by BBC Films.

Production began in March 2013. Producer Zygi Kamasa of Lionsgate said that "we are delighted to be working with the best of British actors and directors like Kate Winslet and Alan Rickman as we move forward in doubling our investment in British films in 2014." Rickman said: "The film is not just frills at the wrists and collars. It's about people getting their hands dirty and building something in order to entertain the other world they serve. It's about how one world maintains the other, often at the cost of women."

Casting

On 17 January 2013, it was announced that Kate Winslet and Matthias Schoenaerts had been cast as the leads in the film. Rickman had Winslet in mind for the lead role of Sabine de Barra and continued with her when two weeks into shooting, Winslet announced that she was pregnant. In addition to directing, Rickman took the role of King Louis XIV. He explained that "the only way I could do it was because in a way, he's like a director, Louis, so you kind of keep the same expression on your face. As a director, you see everything somehow. It's like a huge all-encompassing eye that sees everything, and it's able to cherry pick; ‘Move that,’ ‘Don't do that,’ ‘Do it this way,’ ‘Change this colour.’ And I don't know where that comes from, but it does, once you're given the job, and I have a feeling Louis probably would've been a great film director."

Filming
Despite being set in France, complete filming took place in England. Principal photography commenced on 27 March 2013 and continued over eight weeks in Black Park, Cliveden House, Pinewood Studios, Blenheim Palace, Waddesdon Manor, Hampton Court Palace, Ham House, Ashridge, and Chenies Manor. Filming ended on 8 June 2013 in Richmond, London.

According to Rickman, filming "wasn't easy, though; throwing Kate into freezing water at 1 a.m., the carriage crash, scenes with 80 extras, tight schedules in venues like Blenheim Palace. It's a constant tap dance between control and freedom and of course the budget guides everything."

Music

The soundtrack was composed by Peter Gregson. It was the first feature film for Gregson, who previously composed music for a 2014 short film Every Quiet Moment. Veigar Margeirsson's 2008 composition "Rise above" was used in the trailer of the film but was not part of soundtrack album, which was released by Milan Records on 16 April 2015.

Soundtrack listing

Distribution

Promotion
BBC Films revealed footage from the film as part of their BBC Films Sizzle Showreel 2013 on 25 November 2013. First stills of Kate Winslet were released on 22 July 2014 with the announcement of film's premiere at 2014 Toronto International Film Festival. Three images from the film featuring Winslet, Alan Rickman, and Jennifer Ehle were released on 27 August 2014. A scene from the film featuring Winslet and Rickman was revealed on 9 September 2014. The full-length official trailer was revealed on 19 December 2014. The first poster and another trailer were released on 20 January 2015. On 11 June 2015, another scene from the film featuring Stanley Tucci was released.

Release
The film had its world premiere at the 2014 Toronto International Film Festival as the closing night film on 13 September 2014. It was then shown in gala screenings as Love Gala at the 2014 BFI London Film Festival on 17 October 2014. Rickman presented the film at Camerimage film festival in November 2014. The United States premiere was held at the Sonoma International Film Festival on 25 March 2015. It had a theatrical release in Australia on 26 March 2015 and in UK on 17 April 2015.

It was initially set for a theatrical release on 27 March 2015 in the United States but it was later pulled out. Focus Features finally gave the film a theatrical and VOD release simultaneously in United States on 26 June 2015.

Reception

Box office
As of July 2015, the film has been opened in fourteen territories including Australia and UK and had grossed $10,084,623 worldwide.

Critical response

The film generated mixed reviews from critics, with the performances from the cast being highly praised. , the film holds a 48% approval rating on review aggregator, Rotten Tomatoes, based on 92 reviews with an average score of 5.41/10. The site's consensus states that "Stylish and well-acted without ever living up to its dramatic potential, A Little Chaos is shouldered by the impressive efforts of a talented cast." At Metacritic, which assigns a weighted mean rating out of 100 to reviews from mainstream critics, the film holds an average score of 51, based on 21 reviews, which indicates "mixed or average reviews".

Catherine Shoard of The Guardian gave the film two out of five stars and wrote that "Winslet manages emotional honesty within anachronistic confines, and Schoenaerts escapes with dignity." Mark Adams in his review for Screen International said, "the film is a gracefully made delight, replete with lush costumes, fruity performances, love amongst the flowerbeds and even a little mild peril. Yes it lacks real dramatic edge and may be seen as a typical British period costume film, but it is also a classily made pleasure that will delight its target audience." David Rooney of The Hollywood Reporter felt that "This decently acted film is agreeable entertainment, even if it works better on a scene by scene basis than in terms of overall flow."  Tim Robey in writing for  The Telegraph said in his review: "If you see only one film about 17th-century French landscape gardening this year, it probably ought to be A Little Chaos, a heaving bouquet of a picture."

David Sexton of the London Evening Standard gave the film a negative review, saying that "Kate Winslet charms as a gardener at the Court of Louis XIV, but it's not enough to keep this inauthentic piece from wilting." Dennis Harvey of Variety criticised the film, calling it "all too tidy as it imposes a predictable, pat modern sensibility on a most unconvincing depiction of late 17th-century French aristocratic life." Kaleem Aftab of The Independent gave the film two out of five stars, noting that while the performances were exceptional, the talents of the players were wasted. He wrote that "it all starts off so promisingly" and praised the camera work and language, but found it quickly fails as "a melancholic look at grief" where "at least four different genres [clash] against each other, occasionally in the same scene" and "the romance seems to take place off-screen." She concluded: "There was a 17-year gap between Rickman's first and second film and on this evidence it's easy to see why. While he can get performances out of the actors, he lacks command of pacing and plot."

Historical accuracy
Some of the film's characters are fictional, including Kate Winslet's Sabine de Barra. The film is set in 1682, but André Le Nôtre began work at Versailles in 1661. Le Nôtre was nearly seventy in 1682, twice the age he appears to be as portrayed by Schoenaerts in the film. A garden much like that in the film exists at Versailles, the Salle de Bal or Bosquet de la Salle-de-Bal (the Forest Ballroom).

References

External links
 A Little Chaos at BBC
 
 
 
 

2014 films
2014 biographical drama films
2010s historical drama films
British biographical drama films
British historical drama films
Films set in the 1680s
Films set in the 17th century
Films set in France
Films directed by Alan Rickman
Films shot in London
Films shot in England
Palace of Versailles
Films about Louis XIV
Films shot at Pinewood Studios
BBC Film films
Focus Features films
Lionsgate films
2014 drama films
2010s English-language films
2010s British films